Sub Rebellion, known in Japan as , is a submarine simulation video game developed by Racjin and published by Irem and Metro3D for PlayStation 2 in 2002.

Plot 

The game takes place in the year 2145, fifteen years after a cataclysmic event involving massive-scale movement of the Earth's crust, resulting in two thirds of the planet being very deeply submerged underwater, as well as the exposure of a mysterious ancient civilisation that had been concealed throughout the planet. In the present, the Meluguis Empire, a cruel, oppressive and militaristic regime, is striving for world domination, and it is opposed by the Allied Forces. In a desperate effort to reverse the highly unfavourable war situation they are in, the Allied Forces develop a highly advanced submarine called the Chronos, a vessel capable of great manoeuvrability and prowess in underwater combat. This new submarine is provided to a crew of mercenaries who have volunteered to fight in service to the Alliance.

The first mission the mercenaries operating the Chronos undertake involves fighting through Imperial forces in a large city area in order to eliminate two clusters of magnetic mines, followed by the destruction of a large minelayer submarine. The second mission involves fighting through an ancient ruin to reach a goddess statue buried under rock, while surviving an enemy driller submarine ambush after the excavation. The third mission involves fighting to reach and destroy multiple Imperial land batteries, followed by interception and destruction of an enemy destroyer. The fourth mission involves deployment to the Caribbean, fighting to destroy multiple unmanned enemy underwater batteries positioned along and inside a massive fissure, followed by rescuing an allied submarine trapped under fallen rocks. After this rescue, the Chronos is immediately attacked by the Hammerhead, a very fast and technologically sophisticated submarine crewed by mysterious enemy mercenaries in service to the Empire. The Chronos crew seriously damage this enemy vessel and it retreats. The fifth mission involves fighting through a cave in close-quarters combat to eliminate Imperial submarines and excavate a strange artefact (called Medusa Head). The artefact is excavated before the air supply of the Chronos is depleted. The sixth mission is a deployment to a deep sea area in the Azores, involving hunting down and destroying four seriously dangerous large enemy submarines, followed by engaging and destroying a massive, heavily armed and heavily armoured submersible battleship. In the ruins of this battleship contains a fragment of an ancient board. The seventh mission is a deployment to the southern tip of Greenland, involving the neutralisation of three heavily defended Imperial command centres of land bases. After the destruction of the command centres, the Chronos is ambushed by four enemy driller submarines, but the Chronos crew destroy them. The eighth mission involves scouring ancient ruins in order to acquire the other fragments of the ancient board, fighting and destroying Imperial forces along the way. The completed ancient chart goes into details about spatial/time warps and an escaped "guardian", as well as spatial relations of the Bermuda area. The ninth mission is a deployment to the Bermuda area, involving surface assault on multiple enemy helicopters and depth charge-dropping tandem rotor helicopters. After their elimination, the crew of the Chronos are ordered to investigate an intense energy reaction coming from underwater. When the Chronos approaches a strange statue, it is revealed to be the Guardian of Yore. The guardian activates, traps the Chronos inside an energy barrier and attempts to destroy it. This dangerous entity is killed by the mercenaries. The Guardian is revealed to be part of the Ancient Civilisation (named 'Promethea'), being one of several such entities that had put in place to defend the civilisation's lands. The tenth mission involves making contact with four allied submarines that have acquired highly important intelligence on the enemy and are taking refuge in heavily defended enemy territory. After the intelligence is gathered, an enemy destroyer arrives. After the destroyer is sunk by the Chronos, the Hammerhead arrives (equipped with deadlier weapons), discovering the Chronos's wavelength and communicating with the crew. The Chronos and Hammerhead fight each other again, with the Hammerhead again being seriously damaged and driven off. The defeat of the Hammerhead causes serious damage to its reputation, with it being transferred from front-line duties to exploring ruins. The intelligence gathered by the allied submarines revealed the Empire's plans to develop a flying boat that will be used to carry out a concentrated carpet bombing on Allied Headquarters. The eleventh mission is a deployment to Allied Headquarters located in the underwater New York ruins. The Chronos is sent to fight and destroy several Imperial reconnaissance submarines, followed by being tasked with defending the main base from a surprise attack made by a large and seriously dangerous Imperial assault force. An intelligence leak is suspected, with a spy being responsible. The twelfth mission involves pursuing the enemy spy (Lieutenant Commander Dempsey) through a cave network in order to discover the Imperial intelligence base, fighting enemies along the way. Once the base is discovered, Dempsey and the base are eliminated. After this success, it is then revealed that the Allied Forces are no longer in a losing situation in the war, and are now on an even par with the Empire.

The thirteenth mission involves deployment to the northern straits, involving destroying multiple Imperial heavy underwater batteries. After this, the Poison Moth, the Empire's large flying fortress seaplane, enters the area. The Chronos attacks and destroys the heavily armed and dangerous aircraft before it can gain altitude, preventing the carpet bombing attack on Allied Headquarters. The Allied Forces achieve control over the northern region. The fourteenth mission is a deployment to an ancient ruin, involving protecting three allied submarines equipped with special sonar against attacking enemy forces. A second goddess statue is discovered, and when it is placed against the one discovered in the second mission, they both warn against use of the "Stillness". The fifteenth mission involves eliminating an enemy excavation team trying to acquire a Sphinx-like Promethean object. Once the team is eliminated, the object activates, and is revealed to be a highly powerful and dangerous Guardian capable of skating on water, and it tries to destroy the Chronos, but the Chronos crew manage to kill it. With constant achievement of military victories, the war is now in the Allies' favour, with their power surpassing the Empire. The sixteenth mission is a deployment to the old city area, involving eradicating an enemy special weapons team prepping an extremely dangerous device. After this is done, two large and powerful enemy submarines arrive. After they are wiped out, the Chronos is sent to investigate an energy reaction. When the Chronos arrives, an ancient weapon is launched by the Empire. The Chronos pursues and disables it by destroying its propulsion system. There is speculation around the existence of a Promethan Holy Ground. In the seventeenth mission, there is a deployment to a labyrinth-like ancient ruin, involving fighting through Imperial forces to investigate an energy reaction very strongly suspected of having an ancient weapon (known as a Hidon) as its source. The Chronos reaches the weapon site, an aerial garden, before the Imperials do and excavates the weapon. The Hammerhead arrives (now with deadlier weapons) with backup and fights the Chronos, with the Hammerhead crew dismissing the war as meaningless. Again, the Chronos wins and the Hammerhead retreats. The Allied Forces intend to use the Hidon to destroy the Empire's main base. The Allies unleash the weapon the base, causing utter devastation and wiping out half of it. The eighteenth mission involves an all-out assault on the rest of the Empire's main base. When it and the defenders are destroyed, the enemy flagship Gleia attempts to escape (having the enemy Chiefs of Staff on board), but that too is destroyed. The Allied Forces now control around 70% of the Atlantic Ocean, but the Emperor refuses to surrender. The Allies, intent on ending the war, advance to Old Guinea, where the Imperial Palace and the Emperor are located. The nineteenth mission involves hunting down and wiping out two large Imperial fleets attempting to flee to the Pacific Ocean. After this mission, the Allies' Third Fleet advances on the Imperial Palace and captures it after a ferocious battle. However, the Emperor commits suicide before the Allies can reach him. The Emperor's death prevents the quick achievement of a peace treaty and a ceasefire.

The twentieth mission involves exploring an ancient ruin, searching for ancient artefacts. The Empire's forces are present, having resorted to piracy. After the artefacts are acquired, the Chronos crew brings them to the door of the Promethean Holy Ground. The opening of the door triggers serious tremors, causing rock to fall from the ceiling. The falling rock damages the Chronos's hull, causing air to leak out. The Chronos escapes in time. In the twenty-first and final mission, the Chronos crew are tasked with investigating the Promethean Holy Ground and discovering the "Stillness". The Chronos races across the Holy Ground acquiring charters and proceeding to uncover new ones before their signals die out. The charters reveal that the High Council, the leaders of the Promethean Civilisation, ordered the deep submersion of the majority of the Earth into water. The charters reveal that the Prometheans are aliens, and that the vast majority of them evacuated the planet, returning to the Mother Star before Earth's submersion, with a small number of them choosing to remain. After these charters are gathered, the Hammerhead arrives again (now with deadlier weapons and a paralysing blaster), its crew furious at the Chronos crew for the intrusion and the damage it has caused to the area, with this severely angered crew revealing themselves to be Promethean aliens. A vicious fight ensues, with the Chronos eventually winning. The Hammerhead is critically damaged and has no means of escape. Its crew laments its failure to protect the Holy Ground, before they commit suicide by smashing their vessel into the central energy barrier, destroying it. As a result of this, the central energy barrier deactiviates. The Chronos enters the central area, and this causes the "Stillness" to activate. The Stillness is revealed to be a very powerful and dangerous Guardian of pyramid form. The Chronos fights and destroys it, ending the mission.

In the epilogue, it is confirmed that a geosphere manipulation device found in Promethean Holy Ground was used to cause the cataclysmic submersion of the Earth. It is stated that researchers believe that, while it may take time, the water levels will drop and the Earth will eventually return to normal. The game asserts that that technological advance walks hand-in-hand with great tragedy, and that countless battles in the name of noble causes show this all too well. The game also asserts that if humanity is ever to outgrow the fundamental drive to war, it must progress to a more advanced level of consciousness.

Reception

The game received "average" reviews according to the review aggregation website Metacritic. In Japan, Famitsu gave it a score of 30 out of 40.

Notes

References

External links
 

2002 video games
Irem games
Metro3D games
PlayStation 2 games
PlayStation 2-only games
Racjin games
Single-player video games
Submarine simulation video games
Video games developed in Japan